The 2008 K3 League was the second season of amateur K3 League. It consisted of two regular stage and final playoffs. The winners of each stage and the top two clubs of the overall table qualified for the league playoffs and the 2009 Korean FA Cup. The fifth-placed team also qualified for the Korean FA Cup.

Regular season

First stage

Second stage

Overall table

Championship playoffs

Bracket

Semi-finals

Final

2–2 on aggregate; Yangju FC won on away goals.

See also
2008 in South Korean football
2008 Korean FA Cup

References

External links
RSSSF

K3 League (2007–2019) seasons
2008 in South Korean football